Anthony Sichi (born 21 June 1986) is a French former professional footballer who played as a midfielder.

Honours
Istres
 Championnat National: 2008–09

External links

Player card - Foot-National.com

1986 births
Living people
Association football midfielders
French footballers
Ligue 1 players
Ligue 2 players
Championnat National players
Championnat National 2 players
Championnat National 3 players
FC Istres players
AS Beauvais Oise players
US Orléans players
RC Strasbourg Alsace players
AS Cannes players
FC Martigues players
AS Béziers (2007) players
SO Romorantin players